The Čepkeliai Marsh is the largest bog (a mire) in Lithuania. Located in Varėna District Municipality, south of Marcinkonys village and north of Kotra River, which flows along the Belarus–Lithuania border in this area. Its area is a nature reserve and a Ramsar site.

Protected status
The area of the swamp is protected as a state nature reserve (Čepkēliai Reserve), with its administration in Marcinkonys, and part of the cross-border wetlands of international importance:  Kotra-Cepkeliai Transboundary Ramsar Site established in 2010. It consists of the Kotra Ramsar site in Belarus (designated in 2002) and the Čepkeliai Mire Ramsar site in Lithuania (designated in 1993). In 2011 the Čepkeliai Nature Reserve together with Dzūkija National Park were certified as PAN parks. 

It was created in 1975, and is protected since 1960 (initially as a botanical-zoological sanctuary). It is also part of Natura 2000, the European ecological network.

Nature
Most of Čepkeliai is a raised bog while there are some smaller areas of a fen and flooded forests. There are 21 small bog lakes in the area, some of them are Glacial Age  relicts, remnants of larger lakes that have been swamped. A peat stratum is of 5–6 meters of thickness.

It grows a lot of cranberries, wild rosemaries, heather. The reserve is a sanctuary for cranes, white-tailed eagles, black grouses, heather cocks, mountain hares, martens, smooth snakes.

Visiting
The Čepkeliai Marsh is closed for visiting, except from the observation tower and an educational trail by the edge of the marsh south to Marcinkonys village. The track was closed since June 2021. Cranberry and mushroom picking is allowed for 10 says in early September for residents of the nearby villages with a permit, for personal use only.

Gallery

References

Wetlands of Lithuania
Ramsar sites in Lithuania
Varėna District Municipality